Joseph Mbugi (born 2 February 1986) is a Kenyan international footballer who plays for Posta Rangers, as a midfielder.

Career
Mbugi has played club football for Mahakama, Posta Rangers and Tusker.

He made his international debut for Kenya in 2012.

References

1986 births
Living people
Kenyan footballers
Kenya international footballers
Mahakama F.C. players
Posta Rangers F.C. players
Tusker F.C. players
Kenyan Premier League players
Association football midfielders